DZSB (104.1 FM), broadcasting as 104.1 Spirit FM, is a radio station owned and operated by the Roman Catholic Apostolic Vicariate of Calapan. The station's studio and transmitter are located along Durian St. near St. Benedict Chaplaincy, Brgy. Lalud, Calapan. The station simulcasted on cable via Calapan Cable Channel 64.

References

Catholic radio stations
Radio stations in Mindoro
Radio stations established in 2006